Frank Reed Horton (July 17, 1896 in Sewickley, Pennsylvania – August 28, 1966 in Easton, Pennsylvania), was a United States educator. He is best known as the founder and first national president of Alpha Phi Omega, an international service fraternity.

Early life and education
Frank Reed Horton was born July 17, 1896 in Sewickley, Pennsylvania. He attended and graduated from Worcester Academy in 1914 and then obtained an associate degree in law from Boston University in 1917 and an A.B. and M.A. degree in history from Lafayette College in 1926 and 1938, respectively. In 1937, he was awarded and L.L.B. degree from  La Salle Extension University.

Fraternities
Horton was the founder and first national president (1926–1931) of Alpha Phi Omega, which grew to eighteen campuses and established its first national structure under his leadership.

Horton also was a member of Sigma Alpha Epsilon social fraternity, Kappa Phi Kappa Education Honorary, and the Square and Compass (a Freemasonry college group) while at Lafayette.

Military
Horton joined the U.S. Navy in 1918, commissioned an Ensign in 1919. As an ensign, he served on the minesweeper  shortly after World War I and received the World War I Victory Medal with Minesweeper Clasp.

Awards
His fraternity leadership won him several awards, including:
Numerous Alpha Phi Omega honors and awards
The National Distinguished Service Key 
The naming of the 1966 national fall pledge class in his honor.

Among fraternity members, he is sometimes referred to as "The Lightbearer" since he was the principal founder of Alpha Phi Omega.

Horton was heavily involved in Scouts and other community organizations, holding the following role:

Deputy Scout Commissioner, Easton Scout Council, PA, 1923
Scout Executive, Homestead District Council, PA, 1927–28
Scout Executive, Shenandoah Area Council, Winchester, Virginia, 1929-1931
Member, Freemasonry, 1918; Royal Arch/York Rite, 1919; Scottish Rite
Member, Kiwanis (joined between 1920–22)
Member, Knights of Pythias (joined between 1920–22)

References

External links

Frank Reed Horton biography at Alpha Phi Omega website

1896 births
1966 deaths
Alpha Phi Omega founders
Boston College alumni
Cedar Crest College faculty
Educators from Allentown, Pennsylvania
Lafayette College alumni
Military personnel from Pennsylvania
People from Easton, Pennsylvania
People from Sewickley, Pennsylvania
United States Navy officers
Worcester Academy alumni